Sergio Ottolina (born 23 November 1942) is an Italian former sprinter. He won a bronze medal in the 200 m at the 1962 European Athletics Championships and a silver medal in the sprint medley relay at the 1966 European Indoor Games.

On 24 June 1964 he set a European record in the 200 m at 20.4 seconds that stood for three years. He competed at the 1964 and 1968 Summer Olympics in five individual and team sprint events in total, with the best achievements of seven place in the 4 × 100 m relay (1964 and 1968) and in the 4 × 400 m relay (1968). Ottolina retired from competitions shortly before the 1972 Games due to a motorcycle accident.

International competitions

National titles
Two titles in the 100 metres at the Italian Athletics Championships (1963, 1964)

See also
 Italy national relays team at the international athletics championships

References

External links
 

1942 births
Living people
Italian male sprinters
Olympic male sprinters
Olympic athletes of Italy
Athletes (track and field) at the 1964 Summer Olympics
Athletes (track and field) at the 1968 Summer Olympics
Mediterranean Games gold medalists for Italy
Mediterranean Games bronze medalists for Italy
Mediterranean Games medalists in athletics
Athletes (track and field) at the 1963 Mediterranean Games
Athletes (track and field) at the 1967 Mediterranean Games
European Athletics Championships medalists
Italian Athletics Championships winners
Japan Championships in Athletics winners
20th-century Italian people
21st-century Italian people